Coggles is a British designer clothing retailer. It was founded by Victoria Bage in 1974 and bought out of administration by THG plc in 2013.

History 
Coggles was founded by Victoria Bage in York in 1974.  Bage stated that she named the company after a woman who was allegedly having an affair with Bage's husband. Bage's son, Mark Bage, modernised the shop and launched an online store in 2006.

Coggles entered administration in 2013. The physical stores were liquidated and the online side business sold to the e-commerce retailer, The Hut Group. In December 2017, the company opened its first physical shop since 2013 in Alderley Edge, Cheshire.

References 

THG (company)
Online retailers of the United Kingdom
Retail companies established in 1974
English brands
Clothing retailers of England
Companies that have entered administration in the United Kingdom